RFA Dingledale (A144) was a Dale-class fleet tanker of the Royal Fleet Auxiliary. She was first based at Gibraltar, and served as escort oiler on several Malta Convoys. Narrowly escaping damage during a severe air raid in Bône in December 1942, she survived to join the Pacific Fleet Train, and was present for the Japanese surrender in Tokyo Bay. After the war, she carried out routine freighting duties. She was decommissioned on 10 May 1959, and was laid up at Devonport.

References 

 
 

Dale-class oilers
Tankers of the Royal Fleet Auxiliary
1941 ships
Ships built in Govan
Ships built by Harland and Wolff